Srednji Radenci is a small settlement on the left bank of the Kolpa River 4.5 km south of Stari Trg ob Kolpi in the Municipality of Črnomelj in the White Carniola area of southeastern Slovenia. The area is part of the traditional region of Lower Carniola and is now included in the Southeast Slovenia Statistical Region.

References

External links
Srednji Radenci on Geopedia

Populated places in the Municipality of Črnomelj